Palpita austrannulata is a moth in the family Crambidae. It was described by Inoue in 1996. It is found in Australia, where it has been recorded from the Northern Territory.

References

Moths described in 1996
Palpita
Moths of Australia